Kennedy Chiedza Tsimba (Zimbabwean pronunciation: Shining Light; born 23 July 1974) is a 2012 World Rugby Hall of Fame inductee, South African professional Rugby coach and former player who is the current Director of Rugby at St Alban's College in Pretoria.

Tsimba made his professional debut playing at the inaugural Rugby World Cup 7's in 1997 after which he signed his first professional contract with the 1998 European Champions Bath Rugby Club.  It was at the South African based franchise Free State Cheetahs that Tsimba became famous.  Tsimba became a prolific point scorer and South Africa's fastest player to score 1000 points in all competitions (Currie Cup, Vodacom Cup and Super Rugby)  He won Currie Cup, Vodacom Cup and Super Rugby titles, earning him the title "The King of Bloemfontein".  Tsimba won Vodacom player of the year in 2000, Free State Sportsman of the Year 2001 and Currie Cup player of the Year 2003 in his 6 year spell at the Bloemfontein based team.

In November 2005, after 6 years with Free State Cheetahs he transferred the Blue Bulls Rugby Union for an undisclosed fee. He was part of the club's historic SuperRugby success as part of a star studded squad. In 2008, he rejoined FreeState Cheetahs in a deal where he would appear for Griffons on loan where they won the Currie Cup 1st Division - Tsimba then claiming the 1st Division Currie Cup Player of the Year before retiring in 2010.

In 2011 Tsimba played for Crusaders 4th side at inside Centre.

Coaching career

After retiring Tsimba transitioned into coaching and was appointed as an assistant coach with the FreeState Cheetahs SuperRugby team in 2011 before assuming the role as Coach of Rustenburg Impala 1st team and Head of Academy.

Impala went on to win the South African Community 2 out of 3 finals in a row while Tsimba was part of the club.  His technical ability and recruitment strategies were a key component to the Clubs raise to the top of South African Clubs.

In 2016 Tsimba moved into the very competitive South African Schools Rugby market in joining Pretoria based school - St Alban's College as Director of Rugby and 1st Team Coach

Additional activities

After retiring Tsimba was invited to join the SABC 2007 and 2015 Rugby World Cup team as a Rugby Analyst.  He is now currently part of the African broadcaster Kwese ESPN rugby team.

Tsimba released an album titled Stories of the N1, based mainly on his nostalgia towards Zimbabwe.

References

External links

Player Profile

1974 births
Living people
Sportspeople from Harare
Alumni of Prince Edward School
World Rugby Hall of Fame inductees
Zimbabwean rugby union players
Rugby union fly-halves